Salim Boukhanchouche (born 6 October 1991) is an Algerian professional footballer who plays as a midfielder for JS Kabylie.

Career
In mid December 2018, Boukhanchouche joined MO Béjaïa. At the end of April 2019, Boukhanchouche got his contract terminated due to bad behavior.
In 2019, Boukhanchouche signed a contract with ES Sahel.

International career
Boukhanchouche made his international debut for the Algeria national football team in a 2-1 2018 African Nations Championship qualification loss to Libya national football team on 12 August 2017.

References

External links
 

1991 births
Living people
People from Batna Province
Algerian footballers
Algerian expatriate footballers
Algeria international footballers
JS Kabylie players
Olympique de Médéa players
CA Batna players
MO Béjaïa players
NA Hussein Dey players
Étoile Sportive du Sahel players
Abha Club players
Algerian Ligue Professionnelle 1 players
Algerian Ligue 2 players
Tunisian Ligue Professionnelle 1 players
Saudi Professional League players
Association football midfielders
Expatriate footballers in Tunisia
Expatriate footballers in Saudi Arabia
Algerian expatriate sportspeople in Tunisia
Algerian expatriate sportspeople in Saudi Arabia
21st-century Algerian people